Judge Oliver may refer to:

John Watkins Oliver (1914–1990), judge of the United States District Court for the Western District of Missouri
Solomon Oliver Jr. (born 1947), judge of the United States District Court for the Northern District of Ohio
Webster Oliver (1888–1969), chief judge of the United States Customs Court